Paramotor Inc is an American aircraft manufacturer formerly based in Oyster Bay, New York and presently in Weldon Spring, Missouri. The company specializes in the design and manufacture of paramotors.

The company started as an importer of the French Adventure F series of paramotors and also sold the Japanese Daiichi Kosho Beat. It then introduced its own designs, the FX series in the late 1990s.

Today the company produces "ruggedized" paramotors for military and law enforcement customers.

Aircraft

References

External links

Company website archives on Archive.org

Aircraft manufacturers of the United States
Paramotors